Elisa Cella (born 4 June 1982 in Ravenna) is an Italian volleyball player. She played for the Italy women's national volleyball team at the 2005 FIVB World Grand Prix, and 2006 FIVB World Grand Prix.

Clubs

References

External links 
 CEV profile
 FIVB profile
 http://www.bvbinfo.com/player.asp?ID=10721 
 FIVB - Beach Volleyball
 CEV - Confédération Européenne de Volleyball
 Elisa Cella: Poland And France Let Me Grow As A Person
 Giocatrice – Lega Pallavolo Serie A Femminile

1987 births
Living people
 
Italian women's volleyball players
Sportspeople from Ravenna